Blade materials are materials used to make the blade of a knife or other simple edged hand tool or weapon, such as a hatchet or sword.

Blades can be made from a variety of materials. The most common being carbon steel, stainless steel, tool steel and alloy steel. Other less common materials in blades include: cobalt and titanium alloys, ceramics, obsidian, and plastic.

The hardness of steel is usually stated as a number on the Rockwell C scale (HRC). The Rockwell scale is a hardness scale based on the resistance to indentation a material has. This differs from other scales such as the Mohs scale (scratch resistance testing), which is used in mineralogy. As hardness increases, the blade becomes more capable of taking and holding an edge, but is more difficult to sharpen and increasingly more brittle (commonly called less "tough"). Laminating harder steel between softer steel is an expensive process, though it gives the benefits of both "hard" and "soft" steels, to some extent (see Damascus steel).

Steel

Alloy steels

5160, a spring steel. Popular steel for forging swords and large knives, with high toughness and good wear resistance.  Popular sword manufacturers that use 5160 spring steel include Hanwei and Generation 2. 5160 spring steel is mainly used on Medieval type swords.
6150, a chromium-vanadium alloy. Similar to 4140, 6150 is a tough steel with high impact resistance. It can be hardened to the mid-50s on the HRC scale. While a common material for swords or hatchets, it is less than ideal for most knives because of its limited attainable hardness. It tolerates less than ideal temperature control in forging and heat-treating (As does 5160). While it does not hold an edge as well as 1095, it is tough and easy to sharpen.
V-toku1 / V-toku2, alloyed steel with W/Cr's original characteristics.

Tool steels

Tool steel grades used in cutlery: A, D, O, M, T, S, L, W. See also AISI Tool Steel Grades.
The following are tool steels, which are alloy steels commonly used to produce hardened cutting tools:

A2, a steel that trades wear resistance for toughness. It is used in custom made fighting knives by makers such as Phill Hartsfield, Rob Criswell, Mike Snody and John Fitzen (Razor Edge US) and one of the latest to standardize his camp/survival knives in A2 tool steel is Aaron Gough from Gough custom, Canada. A2 was the standard baseline steel used by Bark River Custom Knives. A2 is used as the standard tool steel for the Black Wolf Knives range of Hunting Knives by Marc Godwin, Japan
A3
A4
A5
A6, this grade of tool steel air-hardens at a relatively low temperature (approximately the same temperature as oil-hardening grades) and is dimensionally stable. Therefore, it is commonly used for dies, forming tools, and gauges that do not require extreme wear resistance but do need high stability.
A7 Tool Steel is an A7 type air-hardening tool steel that exhibits exceptional wear resistance. The high carbon and vanadium contents result in numerous, hard vanadium carbide particles in the steel. These carbides exhibit a hardness that is equivalent to approximately 80 to 85 Rockwell C. Resists wear from sliding contact with other steels as well as from contact with dry and wet slurries of hard abrasive particles such as sand, shot blast media, and ceramics.It is Carbon 0.55%  Manganese 0.30%  Silicon 0.30%  Chromium 5.00%  Molybdenum 1.25%  Vanadium 1.25%

A8 
A9
A10, this grade contains a uniform distribution of graphite particles to increase machinability and provide self-lubricating properties. It is commonly used for gauges, arbours, shears, and punches.
D2 is a high carbon, high chromium die steel and is the highest carbon alloy tool and die steel typically used in knife making.  With a chrome content of 12.00%, some call it a "semi-stainless", because of the lack of free Chromium in solution, even though it is defined by ASM and ANSI as stainless which contains at least 11.5% by weight of chromium. It deserves the informal myth: "D2 knives hold an edge forever, and are impossible to sharpen." While not as tough as premium carbon steel, it is much tougher than premium stainless steel.  D2 knife blades were popularized by Jimmy Lile, and later by Bob Dozier. ( AISI D2 / BOHLER K110 / ISO X153CrMoV12 / W. 1,2379 / GB-CINA Cr12MoV / JIS G4404 / SKD11 )
O1, a popular forging steel. Good wear resistance and excellent edge retention. Very tough, but not as much as 5160.  It is most commonly used by Randall Knives, Mad Dog Knives, and many other custom knife makers.
M2, is slightly tougher than D-2. As high-speed tool steel, it is capable of keeping a tempered edge at high temperatures generated in various machining processes. However, it isn't used as widely in factory production knives, as CPM M4 has become more popular. Custom knife makers still use it for knives intended for fine cutting with very thin edges.
M4, see High-speed CPM REX M4.
SAF 2507 is a Sandvik trademarked steel containing 25% chromium, 7% nickel, 4% molybdenum and other alloying elements such as nitrogen and manganese.
T1
T2
S1, a medium carbon shock-resistant steel tool steel which combines moderate hardness with good impact toughness. Carbon content .40 - .55%.
W1, a water hardening tool steel. High carbon content.
W2, tool steel that holds its edge quite well but is not very tough. Has a carbon content of 1.5. Most readily available W2 has a carbon content of no more than 1-1.1%. It can be left at high hardness levels (it can attain a quenched hardness of 67 Rc) and still be quite tough especially in larger knives with thicker spines as the core of the thick portion of the blade does not attain full hardness because of the shallow hardening nature of the steel. Bill Moran considered it to be almost as tough as 5160, but it was unavailable for a period of time. W2 is one of the carbon steels that can produce a nice Hamon in heat treating. 
 SK3, SK4, SK5 - Japanese carbon steels. SK stands for "Steel Kougu" meaning "Steel Tool". The lower number indicates fewer impurities.

CPM Tool Steel

Crucible Industries produces Crucible Particle Metallurgy (CPM) tool steels using a powder metal forge process.
CPM 1V, a proprietary steel, very high toughness, several times higher than A2 with same level of wear resistance.
CPM 3V, a proprietary steel, very high toughness, less than CPM 1V, but more than A2, and high wear resistance, better than CPM 1V. Used by several custom knives makers and factories, including Jerry Hossom, Mike Stewart [Bark River], Reese Weiland, Nathan Carothers, and Dan Keffeler. Makes good choice for swords and large knives.
CPM 4V, a proprietary steel, high-impact toughness and a very good wear resistance. Gaining popularity in Bladesports Competition Cutting knives.
CPM 9V, a modification of CPM 10V with lower carbon and vanadium to improve toughness and heat check resistance.
CPM 10V (AISI A11), highly wear-resistant tool steel, toughness comparable with D2 tool steel. Currently used by a few custom knife makers. Phil Wilson pioneered the use of CPM 10V and numerous other CPM steels in sporting knives.
CPM 15V, a proprietary steel, extremely high wear-resistant tool steel, thanks to 14.5% Vanadium content. Found only in custom knives.
CPM CRU-WEAR, a proprietary steel designed as a CPM upgrade to conventional Cru-Wear and D2 steels, it offers better wear resistance, toughness, and hardness than ingot made Cru-Wear.
CPM S7, a shock-resistant medium carbon tool steel, with outstanding impact toughness and high strength, along with medium wear resistance. It has maximum shock resistance and high compression strength, which gives it good deformation resistance in use while retaining good toughness.

Chrome steel

Chrome steel is one of a class of non-stainless steels which are used for applications such as bearings, tools and drills.

AISI 52100, ball-bearing steel. In terms of wear resistance, a little better than that of the O1 steel, however, 52100 is also tougher. It has very fine carbides, which translates into high edge stability. Repeated heat forging and heat cycling results in a very fine grain structure. Used by many custom makers, Swamp Rat knives use 52100 steel under the name SR101. Also referred to as 100 Cr 6/102 Cr6 as per ISO nomenclature and conforms to BS grade En31.
SUJ2, Japanese equivalent to AISI 52100 steel. 
DIN 5401

Semi-stainless steels 
Steels that did not fit into the stainless category because they may not have enough of a certain element, such as chromium.
V-Gin1, fine-grained steel with Molybdenum and Vanadium for the best effect of Chromium.
V-Gin2, more Chromium is added for better corrosion resistance.
V-Gin3B, more Chromium is added for better corrosion resistance.

Stainless steel

Stainless steel is a popular class of material for knife blades because it resists corrosion and is easy to maintain. However, it is not impervious to corrosion or rust. In order for a steel to be considered stainless it must have a Chromium content of at least 10.5%.

154CM / ATS-34 steels

These two steels are practically identical in composition. They were introduced into custom knives by Bob Loveless c. 1972.
 154CM is produced by Crucible Industries. It is used extensively by Benchmade Knife Company and many others.
 CPM 154 is identical to 154CM in composition, however it is produced by Crucible using CPM Process, bringing all the benefits of Particle Metallurgy technology.
 ATS-34 is produced by Hitachi Metals.
The latter two are considered premium cutlery steels for both folding knives and fixed blades.

300 series

Because the 300 series is non-hardenable (non-Martensitic), they are primarily used in entry-level dive knives and used as the outer layers in a San Mai blade.
The 300 series is non-magnetic.
 302 is a Chromium-Nickel austenitic alloy used for blenders and mixers.
 303 is an austenitic stainless steel specifically designed to exhibit improved machinability.
 303 SE is an austenitic chromium-nickel steel to which selenium has been added to improve machinability and non-galling characteristics.
304L is a low carbon austenitic chromium-nickel steel designed for special applications.
316L is a low carbon austenitic chromium-nickel steel with superior corrosion and heat resisting qualities.
 321 is an austenitic chromium-nickel steel with a high chromium content of 18.00%.

400 series

The 400 series remains one of the most popular choices for knife makers because it is easy to sharpen and it is resistant to corrosion.
 The 400 series is magnetic.
 410 is a hardenable, straight-chromium stainless steel which combines superior wear resistance with excellent corrosion resistance.
 416 is very similar to 410 with the addition of sulfur to improve machinability.
 420 has more carbon than 410, but less than 440. As such, it is softer than 440, but has a higher toughness.

420 series contain several types with various carbon content between 0.15% and 0.40% this steel grade is widely used to make high-end razor blades, surgical scalpels, etc. It obtains about 57 HRC after suitable heat treatment.

420HC (420C) is a higher carbon content 420 stainless steel. The HC stands for "high carbon" and it can be brought to a higher hardness than regular 420 and should not be mistaken for it. Buck Knives, Gerber Knives and Leatherman use 420HC extensively.
420A (420J1) and 420B (420J2) are economical, highly corrosion-resistant stainless steel grades. Knife manufacturers use this material in budget knives, also in diving knives due to its high resistance to corrosion.

440 series has three types: 440A, 440B, and 440C. 440A is a relatively low-cost, highly corrosion-resistant stainless steel. In China, Ahonest ChangJiang Stainless Steel developed 7Cr17MoV, a modified 440A, by adding more Vanadium.
440B is almost identical to 440A but has a higher carbon content range compared to 440A.
440C  is also highly corrosion-resistant but is capable of having a very high hardness. The hardenability of 440C is due to it having the highest carbon content in the 440 group. Because of this, 440C is one of the most common stainless alloys used for knife making. The once ubiquitous American Buck Model 110 Folding Hunter was made of 440C before 1981. Böhler n695 is equivalent to 440C. Knife blades specified as being "440" can typically be assumed to be the lower-hardness 440A grade.

AUS series

The AUS stainless steel series is produced by Aichi Steel Corporation of Japan. They differ from the AISI 4xx series because they have vanadium added to them. Vanadium improves the wear resistance, toughness, and ease of sharpening. In the alloy name the appended 'A' indicates the alloy has been annealed.
 AUS-6 (6A) is comparable to 440A with a carbon content close to 0.65%. It is low-cost steel, with slightly higher wear resistance compared to 420J.
 AUS-8 (8A) is comparable to 440B with a carbon content close to 0.75%. [is often used] instead of 440C. SOG knives uses AUS-8 extensively.
 AUS-10 (10A) is comparable to 440C with a carbon content close to 1.10%.  It is slightly tougher than 440C.

CPM SxxV series

The SxxV series are Crucible Industries stainless steels produced using CPM process.
 CPM S30V, on the lower end of the SxxV steels, it has a carbon content of 1.45%. However, S30V is still considered to be a superior choice for knife making. CPM S30V is used in a wide range of commercial knives.
 CPM S35VN is a martensitic stainless steel designed to offer improved toughness over CPM S30V. It is also easier to machine and polish than CPM S30V. It is used in many high-end kitchen knives. 
 CPM S60V (formerly CPM T440V) (discontinued), very rich in vanadium. CPM S60V has a carbon content of 2.15%. It was uncommon steel, but both Spyderco and Kershaw Knives offered knives of this steel, Boker still offers folders made from CPM S60V.
 CPM S90V (formerly CPM T420V) has less chromium than S60V, but has almost twice as much vanadium.  S90V's carbon content is also higher, around 2.30%.
 CPM S110V has higher corrosion resistance than S90V and marginally better wear resistance. The additional corrosion resistance while retaining all the benefits of S90V makes this steel extremely desired for kitchen cutlery.
 CPM S125V, online information is not available as of August 2014, contact Crucible Industries sales for information. It contains 3.25% carbon, 14% chromium and 12% vanadium, as well as other elements in alloy. Exceptionally high wear resistance, making it difficult to process and machine for knife-makers. At first, only used in custom knives, it has been utilized by larger manufacturers more recently in very limited quantities.
CPM Magnacut is a new, well balanced stainless steel, with impact toughness and edge holding comparable to CPM 4V. Developed by Larrin Thomas and Crucible Industries specifically for the knife industry.

VG series

Japanese stainless advanced alloy steels, manufactured by Takefu Special Steels. As all Steel manufacturers have their secret undisclosed elements in their alloys, the main parts are mostly known to public, and when there was a demand for High-end Cutlery in the kitchen Takefu was one of the first with a so-called Alloy Steel that required little to no maintenance for daily home cook users as well as the professional kitchen. Even today it remains one of the most looked for Steels worldwide.
 VG-1, Takefu stainless alloy steel. Popular steel in Japanese kitchen knives.
 VG-2, high-carbon Mo stainless blade steel.
 VG-5, synergic effect of Mo and V makes carbide finer with added carbon and vanadium.
 VG-7/VG-8W, strengthens substrate and improves tempering performance.
 VG-10(B/W), Takefu special steels, their most well known and stable VG alloy steel. Improved composition to VG-1 but also contains cobalt, vanadium and tungsten. Very fine carbide and structure due to extended R&D, and therefore one of the steels which has the well-established and longest period of trial and error in history and became one of the best highly advanced stable ESR alloys in the world. Very popular around the world, can tempered to extreme hardness while remaining a very high toughness. Very good wear resistance and extreme rust resistance while fairly able to be resharpened.
Due to extreme demand 10 years ago and Chinese counterfeits the steel has been excluded for Japanese market only and no longer can be exported from outside Japan. Chinese counterfeiting of steels where not even close of resembling the original steel and quality and therefore the decision was purely made for retaining the high quality of VG steels and makes the steel exclusively available for Japanese blacksmiths and manufacturers only making it nowadays a rare and exclusive high-end steel. Although old retailers outside Japan may have had a large quantity from the early days, it is officially no longer available outside Japan and only the finished products can be exported from Japan.
 Takefu special steels is one of the few who combines 2 of the VG Steels into one making it officially one of the rare officially stated Damascus Steels. Since forging this steel into successful kitchen cutlery is very complex, the yield rate is extremely low and to find such products is thus extremely Rare and very expensive but ensures you have a very high-quality high-end product.
 San-mai, a composite steel used to make high-end knives. The core is VG-1 and the outside layers are 420j for good rust resistance.

Due to small vanadium content and several undisclosed changes VG-10 has a finer grain content compared to VG-1. Cobalt and nickel improve toughness. Overall, it has way better edge stability compared to VG-1. VG-10 is widely used in Japanese kitchen knives, several manufacturers have used it in various folders and fixed blade knives, but no longer use it, including Spyderco, Cold Steel and Fallkniven.

CTS series

American stainless steels produced by Carpenter Technology using vacuum-melt technology.
 CTS-BD1, high-carbon chromium steel that provides stainless properties with high hardness and excellent wear resistance.
 CTS-204P, offers superior edge retention and surface finish, an ability to be machined to a fine edge, and consistent heat-treatability from lot to lot.
 CTS-BD30P
 CTS-40C(CP), a powder metallurgy, high-carbon chromium stainless steel designed to provide stainless properties with maximum hardness.
 CTS-TMT, a hardenable martensitic stainless steel that combines improved corrosion resistance over Type 410 stainless with hardness up to 53 HRC and improved formability over 17Cr-4Ni.
 CTS-XHP, a powder metallurgy, air-hardening, high carbon, high chromium, corrosion-resistant alloy. It can be considered either a high hardness 440C stainless steel or a corrosion-resistant D2 tool steel.

CrMo/CrMoV Series

Chinese and American stainless steels; the manufacturers are unknown with the exception of 14-4CrMo which is manufactured by Latrobe Specialty Metals.

(The following are sorted by first number.)
 14-4CrMo, manufactured by Latrobe Specialty Metals. A wear-resistant, martensitic stainless tool steel that exhibits better corrosion resistance than 440C stainless steel.
 2Cr13, belongs to 420 grade series, very basic. EN 1.4021 / DIN X20Cr13, widely used in economic cutting tools, 50HRC max after heat treatment.
 3Cr13, in 420 grade series, it contains 420A 420B 420C 420D. 3Cr13 steel is 420B, EN 1.4028 / DIN X30Cr13, 52HRC approximately after heat treatment.
 3Cr13MoV, made by adding more elements molybdenum and vanadium to the 420J2-3Cr13 formula.
 4Cr13, EN 1.4034 / DIN X46Cr13, 420C stainless steel, it obtains about 55-57HRC.
 4Cr13Mo, EN 1.4419 / DIN X38CrMo14, developed based on GB 4Cr13 / DIN X46Cr13 by adding molybdenum.
 4Cr14MoV, EN 1.4117 / DIN X38CrMoV15, good enough to make kitchen knives.
 5Cr15MoV, some knives manufacturers define as 5Cr13MoV, the hardness could be 55–57 HRC. It's widely used to make kitchen knives, high-end scissors, folding knives, hunting knives, etc.
 6Cr13MoV, also written as 6Cr14MoV. The patented name applied by Ahonest Changjiang Stainless steel Co., Ltd. Similar stainless steel grade 6Cr14 (6Cr13)/420D which does not contain molybdenum and vanadium, is superior to make razor blades, surgical scalpels, etc.
 7Cr17MoV, 440A modified with more vanadium elements. The benefits of vanadium (V): increases strength, wear resistance, and increases toughness; the recommended hardness about 55/57 HRC.
 8Cr13MoV & 8Cr14MoV, similar to AICHI AUS-8, an excellent value-priced steel for its performance.
 9Cr13MoVCo, 9Cr14MoV. Chinese-made steels that are similar to 440B but with a higher carbon, cobalt and vanadium content to add more strength to the blade. Uses include high-end barber scissors, hunting knives, etc.
 9Cr18MoV, 440B modified, a higher end Chinese stainless steel used mostly in high-end barber scissors and surgical tools.
 9Cr19MoV, used in items such as the Ultimate Pro Bear Grylls Survival knife.
 99Cr18MoV, 440C modified. Developed by Jaktkit and Ahonest Changjiang in cooperation. Uses ESR technology and hot forging. This improves its work performance, especially toughness, and edge-holding ability.
Sandvik series
 6C27, a common knife steel grade with good corrosion resistance and low hardness, mainly used in applications where the need for wear resistance is low.
 7C27Mo2, generally the same properties as Sandvik 6C27, but with improved corrosion resistance.
 12C27, a grade with high hardness and good wear resistance. Takes very keen edge with moderate edge retention.
 12C27M, another Swedish stainless razor steel. A very pure, fine-grained alloy. A grade with good wear resistance and good corrosion resistance, well suited for the manufacture of kitchen tools.
 13C26, also known as a Swedish stainless razor steel. Generally the same properties as Sandvik 12C27, but with slightly higher hardness but less corrosion resistant. The Swedish steelmaker Uddeholm AB also makes a virtually identical razor steel composition known as AEB-L, which they patented in 1928. Swedish razor steel is a very pure, fine-grained alloy which positively affects edge holding, edge stability and toughness.
 14C28N, designed by Sandvik at Kershaw's behest to have the edge properties of 13C26 but with increased corrosion resistance by adding nitrogen and chromium. Available in Kershaw knives (as of 2012) and in other brands.
 19C27, a grade with very high hardness and wear resistance.

DSR series
Daido stainless tool steels used for kitchen knives and scissors.
 DSR1K6(M), similar to AUS-6 and VG2
 DSR7F, used for high-hardness cutting parts.
 DSR1K7, a steel known to exist. No further information is available.
 DSR1K8, a steel known to exist. No further information is available.
 DSR1K9, a steel known to exist. No further information is available.
 DSR10UA, used for small scissors.
 DSR1K11, a steel known to exist. No further information is available.

High-chrome / high-vanadium stainless steel 

The following Powder Metallurgy steels contain very high levels of Chromium, which at 18–20% produces a steel matrix that is highly corrosion resistant. They also contain relatively high levels of vanadium (3.0% to 4.0%), producing a high volume of vanadium carbides in the steel matrix, associated with excellent abrasion-resistant edge holding.
 M390 – Bohler M390 Microclean. Third-generation powder metallurgy technology steel. Developed for knife blades requiring good corrosion resistance and very high hardness for excellent wear resistance. Chromium, molybdenum, vanadium, and tungsten are added for excellent sharpness and edge retention. Can be polished to an extremely high finish. Hardens and tempers to 60–62 HRC, where it best balances edge holding and toughness. Due to its alloying concept, this steel offers extremely high wear resistance and high corrosion resistance.
 CPM-20CV – essentially Crucible's version of M390.
 CTS 204P – essentially Carpenter's version of M390.
 Elmax – Produced by Bohler-Uddeholm, Elmax is a through-hardening corrosion resistant mold steel using third-generation powder metallurgy process. Often said to be  superior to CPM S30V and CPM S35VN for edge retention and ease of sharpening. Used in most of the 2013 and forward Microtech knives. Elmax is very similar to M390, CPM 20CV, and CTS 204P, but has somewhat lower Vanadium content, and lacks any Tungsten content.

Other stainless

 ATS-55, produced by Hitachi Metals. Has lower molybdenum content than ATS-34, is less wear-resistant than ATS-34 and has been reported to be also less rust-resistant than ATS-34.
BG-42 Slightly higher in carbon, chrome and moly than ATS-34. Must be forged and heat-treated at very high and exact temperatures. Can be used at very high hardness, such as RC 64–66. Not supposed to be brittle, but high alloy steels usually are. Very expensive and hard to work. It is a martensitic stainless high-speed steel that combines the tempering, hot hardness and hardness retention characteristics of M50 high-speed steels, with the corrosion and oxidation resistance of Type 440C stainless. Although often used for aerospace bearings and other critical applications, its excellent wear resistance and corrosion resistance makes it a superior choice for use in cutlery applications.
 Kin-2, Medium-carbon Molybdenum, Vanadium stainless blade steel.
 BNG10, a steel known to exist. No further information is available.
 Co-Special, a steel known to exist. No further information is available.

Several steel alloys have carbon amounts close to or above 3%. As usual, those steels can be hardened to extremely high levels, 65–67 HRC. Toughness levels are not high compared to CPM S90V steel, however, they have high wear resistance and edge strength, making them a good choice for the knives designed for light cutting and slicing works.
 Cowry-X is produced by Daido steel using PM process. Contains 3% carbon, 20% chromium, 1.7% molybdenum and less than 1% vanadium. Other elements are not published or may not even exist. Used by Hattori knives in their kitchen knives KD series.
 ZDP-189 is produced by Hitachi steel using the PM process. It contains 3% carbon and 20% chromium and contains tungsten and molybdenum. Used by several custom knife makers and factory makers including Spyderco and Kershaw in the limited run of the Ken Onion Shallot folders. The Henckels Miyabi line markets this steel with the name "MC66".
 R2 is a PM steel made by Kobe Steel Japan (Kobelco). It is also known as SG2 (Special Gold 2) when it is marked by Takefu Specialty Steel.
 SRS-15 is a High-Speed Tool Steel (HSS) where the 15 represents 1.5% C. One of the earliest known Japanese "super steels". The maker is unknown. A SRS-13 with 1.3% Carbon also exists.

High-speed steel

CPM REX series
CPM REX M4 HC (AISI M4) is a high speed tool steel produced by Crucible using CPM process. M4 has been around for a relatively long time, lately entering custom and high end production knives.  Popular steel for use in Blade sports Competition Cutting knives.
CPM REX 121, is a new high vanadium cobalt bearing tool steel designed to offer a combination of the highest wear resistance, attainable hardness, and red hardness available in a high-speed steel.
CPM REX 20 (HS) is a cobalt-free super high speed steel made by the CPM process.
CPM REX 45 (HS) is an 8% cobalt modification of M3 high speed steel made by the CPM process. As of September 2018 this steel was used in some limited-run production knives from Spyderco. 
CPM REX 54 HS is a cobalt-bearing high speed steel designed to offer an improvement in the red hardness of the popular M4 grade, while maintaining wear properties equivalent to M4.
CPM REX 66 (HSS) is a super high speed steel made by the CPM process.
CPM REX 76 (HSS) is a super high speed steel made by the CPM (Crucible Particle Metallurgy) Process. It is heat treatable to HRC 68–70. Its high carbon, vanadium and cobalt contents provide abrasion resistance comparable to that of T15 and red hardness superior to that of M42.
CPM REX 86 (HSS) is a super high speed steel made by the CPM process. It has a combination of high attainable hardness capability (68-70 HRC), red hardness, and abrasive wear resistance for difficult machining applications while still maintaining good fabricating and toughness characteristics. The composition is designed to provide a balance of vanadium-rich MC and tungsten-molybdenum-rich M6C primary carbides.
CPM REX T15(HSS) is a super high speed steel made by the CPM process. It is a tungsten type high speed containing high vanadium for excellent abrasion resistance, and cobalt for good red hardness, and is used for cutting difficult-to-machine materials where high frictional heating is encountered.
 
Others
K390 - One of the most notorious representatives of the powder steels family. Its produced by Böhler-Uddeholm AG an Austrian-based company. The steel itself is designed in such way that the primary goal for it is to create a mix of supreme edge retention, high level of toughness and great levels of edge strength. Due to the high levels of carbides and lack of high levels of chromium the steel is prone to corrosion. The composition is as follows: Carbon – 2.47%, Chromium – 4.20%, Molybdenum – 3.80%, Manganese – 0.40%, Vanadium – 9.00%, Tungsten – 1.00%, Cobalt – 2.00%, and Silicon – 0.55%. This kind of high speed steel is used in custom and high end knives and its one of the best and most expensive knife steels currently on the market. The level of HRC that can be achieved with a proper heat treat is 66 HRC.
Maxamet is marketed by its manufacturer as a middle-ground between high-speed steel and cemented carbide. Carpenter claims Maxamet has improved hardness and wear resistance over high-speed steels while being tougher than cemented carbides. As of early 2018, it is used in several production knives from Spyderco.

Super stainless steels
The steels in this category have much higher resistance to elements and corrosion than conventional stainless steels. These steels are austenitic and non-magnetic. They are used in knives designed for use in aggressive, highly corrosive environments, such as saltwater, and areas with high humidity like tropical forests, swamps, etc.
These steels can contain 26% to 42% chromium as well as 10% to 22% nickel and 1.5 to 10% of titanium, tantalum, vanadium, niobium, aluminum silicon, copper, or molybdenum etc., or some combination thereof. 
H1, produced by Myodo Metals, Japan. Used by Spyderco in their salt water/diving knives. Benchmade used it as well, later replaced with X15TN.
X15Tn, French steel patented by Aubert&Duval, originally designed for medical industry and jet ball bearings. According to the company data sheet It meets EN 1.4123 standard  (designation X40CrMoNV16-2)  and UNS42025.This is a Martenistic stainless steel, with a high nitrogen content, remelted for optimum structure and properties. Used by Benchmade in their salt water/diving knives.
,
.
Vanax, produced by Uddeholm, is a relatively new, 3rd generation powder metallurgy blade steel in which carbon is largely replaced by nitrogen. This results in a steel with extreme corrosion resistance, excellent edge holding, yet it is fairly easily resharpened while containing a relatively high carbide volume for abrasive cutting edge retention.
LC200N (aka Z-FiNit, Cronidur30, N360) produced by Zapp Precision Metals, is a high nitrogen alloyed tool steel which exhibits superior corrosion resistance combined with high toughness even at hardness up to 60 HRc. Spyderco uses this steel in several of their knives.

Carbon steel

Carbon steel is a popular choice for rough use knives and cheaper options. Carbon steel used to be much tougher, much more durable, and easier to sharpen than stainless steel. This is no longer the case since the coming of super-advanced alloy metallurgy such as VG-10 and SG-2 powder steel for example. These high-end stainless alloys now have all the benefits including hardness, toughness and the corrosion resistance and passed the limits of Carbon steel. Carbon steels lack the chromium content of stainless steel, making them very susceptible to corrosion.

Carbon steels have less carbon than typical stainless steels do, but it is the main alloy element. They are more homogeneous than stainless than other high alloy steels, having carbide only in very small inclusions in the iron. The bulk material is a little bit harder than standard stainless steel such as St-304 (high-end alloys excluded), allowing them to hold a sharper and more acute edge without bending over in contact with hard materials. But they dull by abrasion much quicker, because they lack hard inclusions to take the friction. This also makes them quicker to sharpen but less edge resistant. The only advantage they now hold over high-end stainless steel alloys is much lower production costs. This keeps product prices fairly low.

10xx series

The 10xx series is the most popular choice for carbon steel used in knives as well as katanas. They can take and keep a very sharp edge.

1095, a popular high-carbon steel for knives; it is harder but more brittle than lower carbon steels such as 1055, 1060, 1070, and 1080. It has a carbon content of 0.90-1.03% Many older pocket knives and kitchen knives were made of 1095. It is still popular with many bush crafters and survivalists due to its toughness and ease of sharpening. With a good heat treat, the high carbon 1095 and O-1 tool steels can make excellent knives. 
1084, carbon content 0.80-0.93%. Often recommended for novice knife makers or those without more advanced heat treating equipment due to the ease of heat treating it successfully in such conditions, yet also used by many professional blade smiths for various kinds of knives as it can make excellent knives.
1070, carbon content 0.65-0.75% Used in machetes.
1060, used in swords or Axes. It has a carbon content of 0.55-0.65%
1055, used in swords and machetes often heat-treated to a spring temper to reduce breakage. It has a carbon content of 0.48-0.55%
1045, used in Axes. It has a carbon content of 0.45%

V-x series
V-1/V-2 Chrome is added to improve quenching performance.
V-2C, Pure carbon steel, with impure substances completely removed.

Aogami/Blue-Series
a Japanese exotic, high-end steel made by Hitachi. The "Blue" refers to, not the color of the steel itself, but the color of the paper in which the raw steel comes wrapped.

Aogami/Blue-Num-1 A steel with higher tensile strength and sharpening ability than blue-2.
Aogami/Blue-Num-2 A steel with higher toughness and wear resistance than blue-1.
Aogami/Blue-Super A steel with higher Toughness, tensile strength and edge stability than all other steels in its series.
Aogami/Super blue The same steel as Blue-Super A

Shirogami/White-series

Shirogami/White-1 Hardest among the Hitachi steels,but lacks toughness.
Shirogami/White-2 Tougher than S/W-1 but as not much Carbon content, thus slightly less hard.

Kigami/Yellow-Series Steel

"Better" steel compared to SK series, but worse than both, Aogami and Shirogami. Used in high end tools and low/mid class kitchen knives.

Other proprietary steels

INFI, a unique steel used in Busse knives. It is a tough steel, that resists both wear and corrosion relatively well. Prior to 2002, INFI contained 0.5% Carbon, 0.74% Nitrogen, about 1% Cobalt, and about 0.1% Nickel. In 2002, Busse changed the steel composition by removing Nitrogen, but added 0.63% Silicon for toughness, and the Cobalt and Nickel components were dropped.

Other carbon steel

These steels did not exist in a series.
Shiro-2, Chromium and Nickel are added for better quenching and ductility.

Unassigned steels
The group of these steels is unknown at this time. Please move them to their proper group and provide a description.

4116 Krupp is German steel which is cryogenically quenched during the hardening process. Used in many entry-level knives by Henkels, Wusthof and other German makers hardened to 54-56 RC. High stain resistance but mediocre edge retention. 0.45-0.55% carbon, 0.1-0.2% vanadium, 14-15% Chromium, 0.5-0.8% Molybdenum. In 2017 it made inroads in mid-priced (between 7Cr17Mov and 440C San Mai) Chinese made knives, usually in larger, 9-12" chef's knives and cleavers tempered to RC 56–60 with improved edge retention. Sometimes referred to as 1.4116. Thyssen-Krupp names their steels using standard convention, i. e. removing .1 from w-Nr 1.4116. Under the DIN system, this steel is described as X50CrMoV15, with the X indicating stainless steel, the 50 referring to the carbon content in hundredths of a percent, and the 15 referring to the percentage of chromium rounded to the nearest whole number. Other sources describe it as almost identical to X50CrMoV15 but very slightly different, with the chromium content differing by about half a percent. Yet another name for this steel is 5Cr15MoV, and therefore belongs in the CrMoV family of steels, with this specific steel having performance similar to AUS-8 but with perhaps slightly better corrosion resistance. (5Cr14MoV is also essentially identical, with marginally lesser amounts of chromium. In this naming convention, the number to the left of the Cr indicates the carbon content in tenths of a percent, while the number to the right of the Chromium indicates the percentage of chromium rounded to the nearest whole number.) Krupp 4116 (a.k.a. DIN X50CrMoV15, etc.) is a favorite of high-end, world-famous German kitchen knife makers like Wüsthof and Zwilling J. A. Henckels. Western-style (i.e., flexible) fillet knives made from 4116 are specifically marketed as intended for saltwater fishing because of the corrosion resistance of this steel. On a separate but related note, the X55CrMoV14 described below as Swiss Army Knife steel and also known as Krupp 4110 is also part of this CrMoV steel family.
Acuto 440. manufactured by Aicihi and contains Chromium 0.80-0.95% Silicon 0.35-0.50% Manganese 0.25-0.40% Phosphorus under 0.040% Sulfur under 0.030% Chromium 17.00-18.00% Molybdenum 1.00-1.25% Vanadium 0.08-0.12% contents. specifically designed to meet resistance to corrosion and wear in stainless has not compared to many carbon steels. Its performance tests yield great results and are not used frequently with labels it seems. its edge retention is close to AUS 10 with better corrosion resistance. It is SuperSteel from Aichi newer than aus10 and implications suggest a modified version of this steel in global knives, due to the Yoshida-Shimonakano group is Aichi steel, Toyota, global knives, and many more. Many knife manufacturers use versions of Asus6-10, Asus440a and Asus440c, which also are all Aicihi steel. Many modify to name others, sometimes such as molybdenum vanadium steel.
AL-158
BRD4416 stainless steel
X55CrMoV14 or 1.4110 Swiss Army knife Inox blade steel used by Victorinox.
80CrV2 is commonly known as Swedish Saw Steel. It is a manganese-vanadium steel with 0.8% carbon content, making it a true high-carbon steel; and as such is easily harden able, and with very good edge retention. It has an excellent reputation for toughness and shock resistance, comparable to S7 steel. It is used by companies including Zombie Tools and Winkler Knives.
 15N20, L6, and 8670 are steels containing 1-2% nickel, known for great toughness at around Rockwell C 58–60. L6 is popular for swords; 8670 would also be excellent and is easier to find and cheaper. 15N20 (.75% C, 2.0% Ni) is widely used with 1095 to make pattern-welded ("Damascus") steel.

Common blade alloying elements
Carbon (C)
 increases edge retention and raises tensile strength.
 increases hardness and improves resistance to wear and abrasion.
 reduces ductility as amount increases
 provides hardenability.

Chromium (Cr)
 increases hardness, tensile strength, and toughness.
 increases resistance to corrosion, heat and wear.
 more than 11% makes it "stainless", by causing an oxide coating to form.
 carbide inclusions reduce wear, but bulk material is softer.

Cobalt (Co)
 increases strength and hardness, and permits quenching in higher temperatures.
 intensifies the individual effects of other elements in more complex steels.
 increases resistance to heat and corrosion.

Copper (Cu)
 increases corrosion resistance. (?)

Manganese (Mn)
 increases hardenability, wear resistance, and tensile strength.
 deoxidizes and degasifies to remove oxygen from molten metal.
 in larger quantities, increases hardness and brittleness.
 increases or decreases corrosion resistance depending on the type and grade of steel or stainless steel.

Molybdenum (Mo)
 increases strength, hardness, hardenability, and toughness.
 improves machinability and resistance to corrosion.

Nickel (Ni)
 Adds toughness.
 Improves corrosion and heat resistance.
 Reduces hardness.
 Too much prevents hardening by heat treatment.

Niobium (Nb)
 Restricts carbide grain growth.
 Increases machinability.
 Creates the hardest carbide.
 Increases strength, heat, corrosion resistance and toughness.

Nitrogen (N)
 Used in place of carbon for the steel matrix. The Nitrogen atom will function in a similar manner to the carbon atom but offers unusual advantages in corrosion resistance.

Phosphorus (P)
 Improves strength, machinability, and hardness.
 Creates brittleness in high concentrations.

Silicon (Si)
 Increases strength, heat and corrosion resistance.
 Deoxidizes and degasifies to remove oxygen from molten metal.

Sulfur (S)
 Improves machinability when added in minute quantities.
 Usually considered a contaminant.

 Tantalum (Ta)
Increases corrosion and heat resistance, strength, ductility and toughness.

Tungsten (W)
 Adds strength, toughness, and improves hardenability.
 Retains hardness at elevated temperature.
 Improves corrosion and heat resistance.

 Titanium (Ti)
 increases strength, toughness, heat, and corrosion resistance plus reduces weight.
 increases hardness and wear resistance if nitrogen or carbon are at the surface of the alloy.

Vanadium (V)
 Increases strength, wear resistance, and increases toughness.
 Improves corrosion resistance by contributing to the oxide coating.
 Carbide inclusions are very hard.
 Expensive.
 Increases chip resistance.

Ceramics

Ceramics are harder than metals but more brittle. Ceramic knives can be sharpened with silicon carbide or diamond sandpaper but chip when sharpened on a hard stone or lap.

The harder ceramics may be used in composite form to make them workable.

Aluminum oxide ceramic (Al2O3)
Marketech AO series
AO 95
AO 98

Zirconium oxide (ZrO2)
Very hard, strong and corrosion-resistant, but expensive. Used by Böker.

Other materials

 Stellite and Talonite
 Titanium and its own alloys are often used in diving and EOD (explosive ordnance disposal) knives due to its excellent corrosion resistance and non-magnetic properties. Some titanium blades have a carbide or nitride edge attached instead of a raw titanium (alloy) edge.
 Copper beryllium
 Damascus steel, either pattern welded steel or the ancient crucible steel (wootz, pulad, bulat)

Historical

 Obsidian, used by Native Americans for knives, spears, and arrowheads. This natural glass chips sharper than other stones but is more brittle.
 Other hard stones such as flint and chert.
 Bone
 Wood
 Bronze
 Jade
 Brass
 Copper
 Pewter

References

External links

Efunda - Information On Steels
MatWeb - Materials Information
Spyderco edge-u-cation blade element info
 Free Ebook - Metallurgy of Steel for Bladesmiths and Others Who Heat Treat and Forge Steel – by Professor Verhoeven

Steel
Knives
Swords